Johnshaven is a coastal village along the North Sea located in Aberdeenshire, Scotland.

The flax industry, sailmaking and fishing have historically been an integral part of Johnshaven life and economy.

Johnshaven has a primary school.

Ancient history
Some of the nearest Bronze Age archaeological recoveries are situated somewhat to the north near Stonehaven at the Fetteresso and Spurryhillock sites.

Harbour

By 1847 the natural inlet near the village had been protected by "high water rocks" deposited to offer protection Not until 1871 was the first harbour created: the enclosed area now to the north side. This was adapted in 1884 creating a breach in the southern breakwater to create an inner harbour, and only this double barrier offered Johnshaven protection from the harsh North Sea too which it is highly exposed. Due to multiple rocks flanking the harbour entrance, the harbour is frequently hazardous in bad weather.

Local media 
Alongside the commercial enterprise of the local newspaper, The Mearns Leader, Johnshaven has a Local Community Radio Station in Mearns FM. Broadcasting from nearby Stonehaven in the Townhall, Mearns FM helps to keep Johnshaven up to date with local and charity events, as well as playing a little music. Staffed completely by volunteers, Mearns FM is run as a not for profit organisation, broadcasting under a Community Radio licence, with a remit to provide local focus news events and programming. Jointly funded by local adverts and local and national grants, Mearns FM has one of the largest listening areas of any Community Radio Station owing to the Mearns' distributed population. Mearns FM was set up to try to bring these distant communities together.

Community groups 
Johnshaven contains many prominent community groups.

Benholm and Johnshaven Community Council holds its monthly meetings in Johnshaven village hall on the 2nd Wednesday of each month.

SHARK a small environmental group aims to promote and protect the wildlife and habitats of the local area.

The Johnshaven Parish Church building (Church of Scotland) was put up for sale in summer 2015. For a number of years, the congregation had been united with St Cyrus, to form Mearns Coastal Parish Church. This parish also includes the historic parishes of Benholm and Garvock. Every summer a hugely popular Holiday Club is run in the village hall.

Transport
Johnshaven was served by Johnshaven railway station, on the Montrose and Bervie Railway from 1865 to 1951. The town is today accessed off the A92 coast road that connects Fife and Stonehaven, where it joins the A90 and continues northward to Aberdeen and beyond. Stagecoach run two bus routes that serve Johnshaven; the X7 Coastrider that stops outside Johnshaven on the A92, and the 107 which also serves the hub of the village too.

References

Sources
 C.Michael Hogan. 2008. Fetteresso Fieldnotes, The Modern Antiquarian
 Johnshaven. 1977. United Kingdom Ordnance Survey, 
 Archibald Watt. 1985. Highways and Byways around Kincardineshire, Stonehaven Heritage Society

Villages in Aberdeenshire
Populated coastal places in Scotland